Murray's Sturgeon Shop is an appetizing store and neighborhood fixture in Manhattan's Upper West Side. It is located on Broadway between 89th Street and 90th Street.

The shop was founded by Murray Bernstein in 1945. A few years later, his brother, Sam, became a co-owner. The Bernsteins were born in Poland and immigrated to New York in the 1930s to escape anti-semitism.

The store specializes in smoked fish, especially sturgeon, and caviar. In 1964, the New York Times described it as "one of the busiest places on Broadway" and praised its products as "first quality". The store ships their fish all over the world, and in 1980 Murray's appetizers were being sold at the Neiman Marcus Epicure Shop in White Plains, New York.

Show business personalities Sammy Cahn and Zero Mostel were regulars at the shop.

In 1974, the shop was sold to restaurateur Artie Cutler. Artie took in a partner, Harold "Heshy" Berliner, in 1979. They sold the business to Ira Goller in 1990.

Sam Bernstein died in 1977 and Murray Bernstein died in 2000.

See also
 List of delicatessens

References

External links
 

1945 establishments in New York City
Appetizing stores
Jewish delicatessens in the United States
Jews and Judaism in Manhattan
Polish-Jewish culture in New York City
Restaurants established in 1945
Restaurants in Manhattan
Upper West Side
Broadway (Manhattan)